Martha Alexander Chickering (1886-1988) was a social work educator, Director of the California State Departmemt of Social Welfare (1936-1945) and member of the California Social Work Hall of Distinction. She was included for her work in establishing professional social work education in the state of California.

Early life and education
She attended the NYC YWCA Training School from 1911 until 1913 after graduating from the University of California, Berkeley in 1910. In 1936, she received an economics PhD there.

After retiring in 1945, Martha retired to the Mojave Desert outside Victorville, California. She moved to Pasadena, California when she couldn’t live aLone any longer.  She died there when she was 102.

Career
When Poland was a new nation, from 1918 until 1920, Chickering headed the YWCA there on war reconstruction as part of Herbert Hoover founded American Relief Association.  In the 1920s she was am executive win the Red Cross Associated Charities for five years.

When Berkeley started an accredited social work  certificate program,, Chickering was hired to supervise the field training of the students. In 1939, she became an assistant professor in Berkeley’s Curriculum in Social Services.

Legacy
In 1994, the UC Berkeley School of Social Welfare established the Martha Chickering Fellowship.

Publications
 Into a Free Poland Via Germany Palala Press, hardback published May 24, 2016, ISBN 9781359310354

References

External links
The Founding of a Mojave Desert Community by Martha A. Chickering

1886 births
1988 deaths
American social workers
University of California, Berkeley alumni
University of California, Berkeley School of Social Welfare faculty